The German–Turkish Treaty of Friendship was a non-aggression pact signed between Nazi Germany and Turkey on 18 June 1941 in Ankara by German ambassador to Turkey Franz von Papen and Turkish Minister of Foreign Affairs Şükrü Saracoğlu. It went into effect on the same day.

The pact stipulated that it was to last for ten years, but Turkey severed its diplomatic and commercial relations with Germany in August 1944, after the Soviet Army invaded Bulgaria, and on 23 February 1945 Turkey declared war on Nazi Germany. The pact was dissolved on 24 October 1945, after the fall of the Third Reich, when Turkey joined the United Nations.

Geopolitical context 
After the outbreak of World War II in 1939, Turkish President İsmet İnönü pursued a policy of neutrality, tried to avoid involvement in the war and asked for military equipment deliveries from both the Axis powers and the Allies. Germany tried to draw Turkey away from Britain by using diplomatic efforts.

As Germany was preparing to invade Yugoslavia and Greece in April 1941, German troops arrived at the Bulgarian border and demanded Bulgarian permission to pass through its territory. On 1 March 1941, Bulgaria, wishing to acquire the areas in which Bulgarian-speaking communities lived in Greece (East Macedonia and Thrace) and Yugoslavia (Vardar Macedonia), signed the Tripartite Pact and so formally joined the Axis powers. 

On 4 March 1941, Franz von Papen forwarded a letter from Adolf Hitler to İnönü in which Hitler wrote that he had not started the war and did not intend to attack Turkey. Further, Hitler emphasised that he had ordered his troops in Bulgaria to stay far from the Turkish border to avoid making a false impression of their presence. Hitler proposed a non-aggression pact with Turkey.

On 6 April, Axis troops attacked Yugoslavia (in Operation 25) and Greece (in Operation Marita) through Bulgaria in an effort to secure its southern flank. The invasion of Yugoslavia ended on 17 April and the invasion of Greece on 1 June. Bulgaria annexed the Greek and Yugoslav regions that it had claimed, and the Axis  annexation and the occupation of the Balkan region was complete.

In the meantime, on 1 April 1941, Rashid Ali Al-Gaylani launched a coup d'état, which overthrew the pro-British regime in Iraq. The four generals leading the revolt worked closely with German intelligence and accepted military aid from Germany. Hitler asked Turkey for permission to pass through Turkish territory to give Iraq military assistance. In exchange, the Turkish government demanded border concessions from Iraq. As the negotiations were taking place, British forces attacked Iraq. Between 18 April and 3 June, Britain restored the regime of Emir Abdul-Illah, the regent of four-year-old King Faisal II. The issue between Turkey and Germany was resolved by that development. The German–Turkish Treaty of Friendship was signed on 18 June 1941.

In August 1944, Turkey severed its diplomatic and commercial relations with Germany, which had predated the Friendship Treaty, and on 23 February 1945, Turkey declared war on Germany.

Clodius Agreement
In October 1941, Turkey and Germany signed the Clodius Agreement, named after the German negotiator Karl Clodius. Turkey agreed to export up 45,000 tons of chromite ore to Germany in 1941 and in 1942, and 90,000 tons of the mineral in both 1943 and 1944, contingent on Germany's supplies of military equipment to Turkey. Germany would provide as many as 117 railway locomotives and 1,250 freight rail cars to transport the ore. 

In an attempt to prevent the supply of the strategic mineral reaching Germany, both the United States and the United Kingdom went on a buying spree to buying out Turkish chromite even if they did not need so much of it. As part of the "package deal", the Anglo-Americans also bought Turkish dried fruit and tobacco.

See also 
Anti-Comintern Pact
Germany–Turkey relations
World War II

References 

Treaties concluded in 1941
Treaties entered into force in 1941
1941 in Germany
1941 in Turkey
Treaties of Turkey
Treaties of Nazi Germany
World War II treaties
Foreign relations of Nazi Germany
Germany–Turkey relations
Non-aggression pacts
Turkey in World War II
Franz von Papen